Jay-Z: Unplugged is rapper Jay-Z's 2001 live album that contains some of his past songs with live instruments performed by the hip-hop band the Roots. The album, which sold more than 600,000 copies,   was recorded during the taping of an MTV Unplugged 2.0 episode on November 18, 2001.

Track listing 
All songs were produced by Questlove, The Roots; "People Talking" produced by Ski.

 "Izzo (H.O.V.A.)" – 5:08
 "Takeover" – 4:57
 "Girls, Girls, Girls" – 4:41
 "Jigga What, Jigga Who" – 2:34
 "Big Pimpin'" – 4:11
 "Heart of the City (Ain't No Love)" – 4:05
 "Can I Get A..." – 1:42
 "Hard Knock Life (Ghetto Anthem)" – 1:31
 "Ain't No Nigga" – 1:02
 "Can't Knock the Hustle"/"Family Affair" (featuring Mary J. Blige) – 6:06
 "Song Cry" – 7:04
 "I Just Wanna Love U (Give It 2 Me)" (featuring Pharrell) – 6:58
 "Jigga That Nigga"/"People Talking" – 8:22

Personnel 
 Leonard Hubbard – acoustic bass
 Ahmir '?uestlove' Thompson – drums, producer
 Damon Bennett – flute, recorder
 Ben Kenney – acoustic guitar
 Kamal Gray – keyboards
 Omar Edwards – keyboards
 Aaron "Gushie" Dramper – percussion
 Frank "Knuckles" Walker – percussion
 Scratch – vocal percussion, backing vocals
 The Roots – producer
 Alexandra Leem – strings
 Fiona Murray – strings
 Ghislaine Fleischmann – strings
 Larry Gold – strings
 Jaguar Wright – vocals
 Walik Goshorn - Photography

Charts

Weekly charts

Year-end charts

Certifications

References

External links 
 Jay-Z: Unplugged at Discogs

2001 live albums
Albums produced by Questlove
Albums produced by Ski Beatz
Jay-Z albums
Collaborative albums
Def Jam Recordings live albums
MTV Unplugged albums
Roc-A-Fella Records live albums
The Roots albums
Live hip hop albums